The Armenian orthography reform occurred between 1922 and 1924 in Soviet Armenia and was partially reviewed in 1940. Its main features were neutralization of classical etymological writing and the adjustment of phonetic realization and writing.

The original orthography is now known as the classical orthography ( dasakan uġġagrut'yun) and is sometimes referred to as Mashtotsian orthography, after Mesrop Mashtots, who invented the Armenian alphabet in 405 AD.

Acceptance and evaluation
Today it is the officially used orthography for the Armenian language in Armenia, and widely used by Armenian communities in Georgia and Russia.

It was rejected by the Armenian diaspora, most of which speak Western Armenian, including the Armenian communities in Iran, which also speak Eastern Armenian and still use the classical orthography of the Armenian alphabet. It is still doubted if the reform resulted in orthography simplification. 

Some authors hold that changes introduced into the Armenian alphabet actually simplified writing; for example, the alternation of the letters ‹o› and ‹ո› inside words was finally regulated.

History
One of the most significant and successfully achieved policies of the former Soviet Union was the rise in the overall population's literacy, which began in the early 1920s. That was most probably the urgent need that was one of the reasons for reforming the orthography. With a variety of other educational reforms, the reformed orthography resulted in a literacy rate of 90% in the country by the early 1950s.

Pursuing faster progress, some other nations of the Soviet Union changed their scripts from Arabic (Central Asian nations) and Latin (Moldova) to Cyrillic in the same period. It can be seen as a rather progressive step in the spirit of the historical developments in that it did not hinder the ability of all of the former Soviet nations to develop literature, education, research and science. 

Considering the vast panorama of the linguistic reforms carried out on the whole territory of the Soviet Union, the Armenian case is undoubtedly among the less radical ones. .

This process was initiated in January 1921, when the historian Ashot Hovhannisyan, then Minister of Education of Armenian SSR, organized an advisory meeting to encourage education and fight illiteracy, as required by the Soviet likbez policy. During this consultation, the linguist and philologist Manuk Abeghyan proposed a number of orthographic changes that denoted a radical departure from the general norm in use since the Middle Ages. Abeghyan's position was not new: in fact, he had written extensively on the issue since the late 1890s. Indeed, this document, which was accepted by a special committee in 1921, presented the same theses of another paper Abeghyan read in 1913 in Echmiadzin. Hovhannisyan's successor, the translator and journalist Poghos Makintsyan, continued to work in this direction, forming a new committee in February 1922. Instead of transmitting the committee's conclusions, Makintsyan directly presented Abeghyan's proposal to the Soviet of Popular Commissars. On March 4, 1922, under the chairmanship of Aleksandr Myasnikyan, the reform was officially decreed.

Rules
Since pronunciation has changed, the spelling was modified to follow the modern pronunciation.

Changes can be summarized as follows:

Elimination of the silent  at the end of a word 
The digraph   becomes the 34th independent letter of the alphabet.
The only exceptions are   "who" and   "those (people)" and the present tense of "to be":   "I am",   "you are",   "we are",   "you are",   "they are".
In its place,  is written.
The ligature  was initially abolished, but in 1940, it became the 37th independent letter of the alphabet.
In the conjugation of verbs, in both the indicative and the conditional modes,  is added directly, without an apostrophe before vowels or  before consonants.

Reception and review 
Reform met immediate, unfavorable reactions. Notably, the poet Hovhannes Tumanyan, chairman of the Union of Armenian Writers, expressed his discontent in a letter to the Soviet of Popular Commissars, written in May 1922. Later on, many objected to the reform, asking the restoration of traditional Armenian spelling.  Ch․ S. Sarkisyan's requested to correct the mistakes of the 1922 reform: “Armenian spelling now urgently needs the elimination of the mistakes made in 1922, that is, the abolition of those changes that were introduced into the alphabet”. As a consequence, on August 22nd, 1940, the linguist Gurgen Sevak (1904-1981) promoted a second reform of Armenian orthography, which marked a partial return to Mesropian spelling.

After-effects 
These reforms, which were part of the likbez policy carried out by the Soviets, have deeply affected not only the Eastern Armenian alphabet, but also the set of rules and conventions governing writing and word formation. 

Since the establishment of the third Republic of Armenia in 1991, there has been a fringe movement in some Armenian academic circles to reinstate the classical orthography as official in Armenia. Some members of the Armenian Church in Armenia also support the use of the classical orthography.  However, neither official circles nor the general population or pedagogical and scientific communities in Armenia supports reversing the reform. 

In nowadays Armenia, the 1922 orthography reform is still perceived as a heavy burden, insofar as it undermines the relationship between the two diasporas and the homeland.

Examples

See also 
Reforms of Russian orthography
German orthography reform of 1996
Belarusian orthography reform of 1933
Reforms of French orthography

References

External links 
Armenian Orthography converters
 Armenian Orthography Converter

Spelling reform
Orthography reform
Armenian
Orthography reform
Orthography reform
1920s in the Soviet Union
Orthography reform
Orthography reform
Orthography reform
Reform in the Soviet Union